Tadeda Peak, also known unofficially as Tadeda Centre, is a volcanic peak in northern British Columbia, Canada, located just northeast of Raspberry Pass in Mount Edziza Provincial Park.

See also
 List of volcanoes in Canada
 List of Northern Cordilleran volcanoes
 Mount Edziza volcanic complex
 Volcanism of Canada
 Volcanism of Western Canada

References

Mount Edziza volcanic complex
Two-thousanders of British Columbia
Miocene lava domes